Carlos Nieto may refer to:
Carlos Nieto (rugby union) (born 1976), Italian rugby union player
Carlos Nieto (footballer) (born 1996), Spanish footballer
Carlos Nieto (actor) (fl. 1960s), actor in El mundo de los vampiros
Carlos Nieto (sound engineer) (fl. 2000), engineer on Tu Veneno
Carlos Nieto (Third Watch character)